Rhinoplasty is a plastic surgery procedure to improve the appearance or function of the nose.

Rhinoplasty may also refer to:
 Rhinoplasty (EP), Primus album
 The Rhinoplasty Society, a nonprofit organization

See also 

 "The Nose Job", a season 3 episode of Seinfeld
 "Tom's Rhinoplasty", a season 1 episode of South Park